Walt Disney Television, formerly American Broadcasting Companies, Capital Cities/ABC and Disney-ABC Television Group has formed a number of production companies over the years. ABC Film Syndication, or ABC Films, was ABC's syndication distribution arm from 1953 to 1971 when FCC passed the fin-syn rule. As a result, ABC Films was sold to 5 of its former executives becoming Worldvision Enterprises. ABC's current primary production company is ABC Signature.

A number of production companies were formed under Capital Cities/ABC Video Enterprises, or ABC Cable and International Broadcast Group: Capital Cities/ABC Video Productions, Ultra Entertainment, the Hemisphere Group and DIC Entertainment.

Active

Greengrass Productions

Greengrass Productions, Inc. is a production company of ABC Entertainment, a division of Walt Disney Television.

On June 7, 1996, due to the merger with Disney, Capital Cities/ABC indicated that its ABC Productions division operations would be shut down while keeping its boutique production companies: Victor Television Productions, ABC/Kane Productions, DIC Entertainment and Greengrass Productions. Greengrass was transferred into ABC Entertainment from ABC Productions.

Filmography
TV series

Movies and specials

Lincoln Square Productions

Lincoln Square Productions, LLC (LSP) is a non-fiction branch production company owned by ABC News that produces documentaries and talk shows.

History
Lincoln Square Production was formed as a limited liability company on January 8, 2003.

Lincoln Square had Watt's World (working title) series, which is about journalist Nick Watt traveling to find "little-known places and sub-cultures", in development for the Travel Channel as of Scripps Networks Interactive's upfront event in April 2014. On , The View talk show was transferred into Lincoln Square from ABC Entertainment's Times Square Studios after struggling in ratings and a change in hosts.

In January 2015, Lincoln Square had signed a production deal with Christine Connor's XCON historical docudrama company. For A&E channel, Lincoln Square agreed to produce four specials in 2015 starting with Cosby: The Women Speak. The company agreed in July 2018 to produced films by Robin Roberts under the banner "Robin Roberts Presents" for A&E's Lifetime channel. On April 10, 2019, a slate of 10 unscripted series including Rogue Trip from Lincoln Square Productions was revealed for Disney+. Production of Rogue Trip was later taken over by National Geographic.

Programs
A&E Biography: Jodie Foster (2005)
The Assets (ABC)  - “Ebola: Inside the Deadly Outbreak” (Discovery)
Final Witness (ABC) a seven-episode true-crime series that premiered June 27, 2012
“Mustang Millionaire” (National Geographic Channel)
“NY Med” (ABC)
“Surgeon Oz” (OWN)
“The View” (ABC) —present
"Barbara Walters Presents American Scandals" (Investigation Discovery, 2015) nine-episode season 1
“Next Step Realty: NYC” (ABC Family; 2015—-present) a documentary series that follows the Next Step Realty employees in their specialty of finding recent college graduates apartments
 20/20: In an Instant (ABC; 2015–2018) (with Committee Films)
 9/11: As We Watched (American Heroes Channel) Tuesday, September 6, 2016
 Capturing Bin Laden (American Heroes Channel) September 7, 2016 The End of America: Putin's Master Plan working title (History) Biography brand 2 hours special
 Grace vs. Abrams A&E series (March 29, 2018-) Nancy Grace and Dan Abrams debating infamous crimes and legal cases
 Cosby: The Women Speak A&E special (September 17, 2015) 
 Robin Roberts Presents (Lifetime) telefilm series in which each film would have a companion documentary. Roberts would be an executive producer along with Linda Berman for the films and John R. Green for the documentary.
untitled Mahalia Jackson drama written by Bettina Gilois and documentary
 The Last Defense (2018) (with Xcon Productions and JuVee Productions)
 Reversing Roe (2018) Netflix, 99 minutes; Directors, screenwriters, producers and narrators: Ricki Stern and Annie Sundberg 
 1969 (2019)
 Untitled Mickey Mouse documentary with Tremolo Productions; producer Morgan Neville

 Freeform Studios 

Freeform Studios, the DBA of ProdCo, Inc. (formerly known as ABC Family Productions, later Freeform Original Productions) is the in-house production company of ABC Family Worldwide Inc. for original scripted series.

Programming executive Linda Mancuso died in December 2003. In early 2004, Disney Channel original programming leaders, executive vice president of original programming and production Gary Marsh and original movies VP Michael Healy takes over ABC Family's original movies unit. They move away from the planned romantic comedies to green light two telefilms, Crimes of Fashion and Head Rush.

Jayne Bieber was hired as vice president of production in 2010. As of June 2015, Bieber is Vice President, Production Management and Operations, ABC Family over seeing ProdCo.

In October 2015, ABC Family, ABC Studios and ABC Signature signed a two-year production deal with McG's production banner, Wonderland Sound & Vision. Prior, McG had just put two series in at ABC Family. In January 2016, ABC Family changed its name to Freeform.

Filmography
Telefilms

Television series

Valleycrest Productions

Valleycrest Productions Limited is a television series production company owned by ABC Daytime.

By 1999, Valleycrest was producing "Who Wants to Be a Millionaire" and was a subsidiary of Buena Vista Television by that time.

On , Disney-ABC TV Group placed daytime and syndicated production under Times Square Studios.

Valleycrest moved production of Who Wants to Be a Millionaire in 2014 to the Connecticut Film Center in Stamford, Connecticut, to take advantage of the state's film/television tax credits.

Filmography

Defunct
ABC Circle 7 Productions

ABC Circle 7 Productions, Inc. was the programming subsidiary of the ABC Owned Stations in the 1980s.

In August 1983, Circle 7 Productions announced its Newsbank news distribution service. ABC Circle 7 Productions was incorporated on December 15, 1983.

Programming
Newsbank, news distribution service making about 24 stories available to subscribing stations from ABC's (then) five O&O Stations

ABC Productions

ABC Productions (ABCP) was a television production company that was a division of ABC Television Network Group. While the ABC network had first shot at the unit's shows, the company was allowed to shop shows to other networks and was the first to sell to another network. The company was set up increase the control and financial rewards of producing its own TV shows.

History
ABC Productions was formed in 1989 as ABC Network's in-house production unit after the alteration of the fin-syn rules that increased network ownership to only 40% of prime-time programs. Former ABC Motion Pictures president and ABC Entertainment president Brandon Stoddard on March 21, 1989, to head up the then unnamed production unit, though one source believed it was the former ABC subsidiary ABC Circle Films. In the fall of 1989, it is said that ABC Productions would sign on to develop projects for NBC, HBO and Lifetime.

By early 1991, ABC Productions had purchased Andrew Adelson Co. then signed Andrew Adelson to an exclusive production contract. By May 1991, ABCP produced eight pilots, a series, a miniseries and several TV movies. "My Life and Times" was the company's first series production placed with the ABC network and debuted in May 1991, but was yanked after the ratings dropped 19% from week 1 to 2, so as to avoid May sweeps. While its first miniseries,  "An Inconvenient Woman" was shown on ABC in the May sweeps was produced by Adelson. For Lifetime, ABCP produced a telefilm, 'Stop at Nothing'. Former Cosby Show co-executive producer Elliot Shonman for ABCP created, written and produced Coconut Downs while agreeing to a two-year exclusivity deal. Also signing production deals by June 1991 were Martthew Carlson (an extension), Steve Kronish and Norman Morrill. 29 projects were under development.

By the 1994–95 season, ABC Productions was providing half of ABC's regular series programming. DreamWorks Television was formed in December 1994 as DreamWorks Studios agreed to a $200 million seven-year TV production joint venture with Capital Cities/ABC. ABCP placed "The Boys are Back" with CBS for the 1994–1995 season.

In June 1995, Stoddard stepped down as ABC Productions president. On June 7, 1996, due to the merger with Disney, Capital Cities/ABC indicated that its ABC Productions division operations would be shut down while keeping its boutique production companies: Victor Television Productions, ABC/Kane Productions, DIC Entertainment and Greengrass Productions.Times Staff and Wire Reports. (May 23, 1996). Company Town Annex: ABC to Shut Down ABC Productions. Los Angeles Times. Accessed on December 27, 2013. ABCP executive in charge Brian McAndrews continued managing ABC's other production arms for TV movies, documentaries and children's programming and production interests with DreamWorks SKG, Brillstein-Grey Entertainment and Jim Henson Productions.  McAndrews left in early March 1998 for an ABC Sports position, while Greengrass Productions was folded into ABC Entertainment and its telefilm unit, ABC Pictures, would finish its last five projects then disband.

Filmography

ABC Pictures

ABC Pictures was an in house television movie production company of ABC Productions.

The company agreed to a two-year TV movie and miniseries deal with Gary L. Pudney in 1997 with “The Picture of Dorian Gray” in development under the deal. ABC Pictures agreed on August 20, 1997, with the C.P. Group and BIG Entertainment to develop "Tom Clancy's Net Force", as a four-hour miniseries which was broadcast in 1998.

After its final five projects in development, ABC Pictures was shut down in 1998.

Filmography

ABC Circle Films

ABC Circle Films (ACF or Circle) was a television movie and series production company owned by ABC that operated from 1970 to 1989.

ABC Circle Films was formed after the first season of Movie of the Week to build on the telefilm success. ACF was granted a larger budget (by $250,000) and half an hour longer than the movie of the week thus considered a prestige or "A" movie. Circle's films were shown on Sunday night where they alternated with recent feature films and on Monday night after the end of Monday Night Football. With the 1972–1973 season, ACF began producing films for Movie of the Week including Pursuit.

Lewis H. Erlicht was demoted from president of ABC Entertainment to senior vice president and president of ACF in November 1985.

The company was merged into ABC Productions in 1989.

Filmography

ABC/Kane Productions

ABC/Kane Productions International (AKPI) is/was a nonfiction programs production company owned by Disney-ABC Television Group. The production company earned 13 Emmy Awards, 6 Genesis Awards, numerous CINE awards, film festival awards and an Academy Award nomination.

ABC/Kane Productions International was formed by Capital Cities/ABC Inc. as a unit of its ABC Television Network Group on October 1, 1988, with the appointment of its first president, Dennis B. Kane. Original plans for the unit was five programs a year for five years starting in October 1990 for ABC and other outlets.

ABC/Kane received 11 Emmy nominations in 1998 for The Living Edens series, the highest to date, while winning 5 five news and documentary Emmys. Devillier Donegan Enterprises, a unit of Buena Vista International Television, in February 1999 took over distribution, management and operation of AKPI.

Productions
The Living Edens (1995- PBS)
ABC's World of Discovery
Secrets of the Internet
Tales of the Serengeti 
Wildlife Tales
ABC Saturday Children's Special & series pilot "Crash the Curiosaurus" (January 14, 1995)

Devillier Donegan Enterprises

Devillier Donegan Enterprises (DDE) was first formed by Ron Devillier and Brian Donegan in 1980 as a documentary production company and was reformed in 1994 with majority ownership by Capital Cities/ABC. Disney took over ownership upon its purchase of CC/ABC.  DDE, a unit of Buena Vista International Television, in February 1999 took over distribution, management and operation of ABC/Kane Productions International.  In 2001, DDE began looking for a new owner as Disney is in the movie business with Alliance Atlantis Communications and Granada begin front runners. Instead DDE management on March 11, 2002, bought Disney/ABC stake in the company. DDE also held on to ABC/Kane Productions' library and will continue to represent ABC News Productions.

ABC News Productions
ABC News Productions (ABCNP) is a long form documentary production unit within ABC News's ABC News Digital Media Group. ABCNP produces documentaries for cable channels, international broadcasters and home video.

ABC News Productions was formed in 1994. In August 2006, ABCNP was placed into ABC News All Media along with the ABC News production unit.

Partial filmographyThe Trial of Adolf Eichmann (PBS) Emmy Award nominatedVietnam War (TLC) 8 hours
Biography (A&E) 200 plus episodes

Daily TV showsLifetime Live (Lifetime)She TV (Discovery Health Channel) 

ABC Motion Pictures

ABC Motion Pictures was a production company of ABC that operated from May 1979. 20th Century Fox, to which The Walt Disney Company would purchase in 2019, was the company's distributor. Until October 1985, the division produced theatrical films along with TV movies, series and mini-series.

History
ABC Motion Pictures was founded in May 1979 with Brandon Stoddard as president. Soon the division was swapped with old film projects. While a boutique would make only a few films per year, Stoddard figured that ABC would succeed in movie production as there were additional revenue sources from video cassettes and cable on top of theater ticket sales and broadcast TV sales. ABC Motion Pictures was incorporated by June 11, 1980.

The division waited two years to get its first slate of three films into production with National Lampoon's Class Reunion just an announcement and Young Doctors in Love beginning production in December 1981 under the theatrical directorial debut of Garry Marshall. In June 1982, "Chain Reaction" (later "Silkwood") starring Meryl Streep was expected to be in production.The Flamingo Kid after released by Fox did well but not strong business, Fox pulled the film from release so as to stop spending money on advertising.

With networks getting better rating for their own movies of the week over films released on cable and cassettes, networks reduced licensing of theatrical films. Additional boutique production companies entered the market at the same time crowding the market and increasing filming costs.  With films distributed by a major studio, ABC's films were slotted in less desirable release dates.  On October 28, 1985, ABC shut down ABC Motion Pictures theatrical motion picture operation after the release of only 6 theatrical films which was within weeks of CBS shutting down CBS Theatrical Films. The unit released one last movie, SpaceCamp, already produced in the summer of 1985.  The unit would continue producing TV movies and mini-series while increasing TV series output. A Donaldson, Lufkin & Jenrette Securities Corporation media analyst forecast ABC's losses on its theatrical operations for 1985 to be $5 million. After ABC shuttered down, the company elected to terminate its agreement with Mercury Entertainment in March 1986.

Filmography
Theatrical films

ABC Pictures International

ABC Pictures International, Inc. (also ABC Picture Holdings, Inc.; API) was the theatrical production company owned and operated by ABC from 1965 to 1973 and produced or co produced 37 films. The company's films were distributed by Cinerama Releasing Corporation.

History
In 1968, it activated Palomar Pictures and Selmur Pictures to produce pictures for it. The entry of ABC into theatrical film production led to an FCC inquiry over the network's control of programming and a MPAA anti-trust lawsuit. David O. Selznick owned films were sold after his death in 1965 to API by his widow, Jennifer Jones.

The company's films (including those made by Selmur and Palomar) were not profitable and, with the recession of 1969–1971, ABC Pictures Corporation closed down its operations in early 1973. The 36 films cost $75 million to produce and generated rentals of $107 million, but with other costs such as distribution fees and interest, generated losses of $35 million. Only 6 of the films were profitable.

On October 20, 1977, ABC Picture Holdings, Inc. changed its name to ABC Pictures International, Inc. and was finally dissolved on February 19, 1988.

ABC Media Productions

ABC Media Productions (AMP), originally named Buena Vista Productions (BVP), was the in house television development, production and programming unit within ABC Daytime. The company produces non-scripted programming in all three areas (talk, game, reality) for syndication, cable and prime time outlets including outside the Disney conglomerate. The division has oversight of the production of "Who Wants to Be a Millionaire".

AMP history
In September 2000 following the merger of ABC Daytime Group and Buena Vista's development group, ABC Daytime replaced Buena Vista Development with Buena Vista Productions, to be headed by president Angela Shapiro, who was then also ABC Daytime president. Shapiro was transferred to ABC Family President in April 2002 with Holly Jacobs taking over at BVP as executive vice president the next month.

In August 2006, BVP and Fujisankei Communications partnered to develop and produce "Run for Money," a game show for the American market, adapted from the original Japanese reality-game show of the same title. 
 
In September 2008, BVP entered a first-look development deal with Silverback, a Swedish production company. In 2009, Buena Vista Productions was renamed ABC Media Productions. In May, AMP was developing The Aisha Tyler Show, a variety & comedy talk show with interactive components including social media, for cable or broadcast syndication.

Programs
 Cha$e, Sci Fi Channel
 Who Wants to Be a Millionaire, syndication
 At the Movies With Ebert & Roeper, syndication (1986-)
 "The Fashionista Diaries" (SoapNet)
 "Camouflage" Game Show NetworkWayne Brady Show 

American Broadcasting-Paramount Theatres Pictures

Atlas Pictures Corporation, formerly American Broadcasting-Paramount Theatres Pictures Corporation (also known as AB-PT Pictures and AB-PT) was the film production subsidiary of American Broadcasting-Paramount Theatres.

The company was formed due to a shorting of films produced, which was the reason for AB-PT not to sign a consent agreement in 1949 against the company's production of films. Films from AB-PT were first shown in Paramount Theater circuits prior to release to other chains. AB-PT Pictures used the Republic Pictures lot for productions. Republic was also their distributor, physically delivering to even AB-PT theaters plus sale to non-AB-PT theaters.

American Broadcasting-Paramount Theatres Pictures Corporation was formed on December 30, 1956. Irving H. Levin was appointed President of the company. AB-PT Pictures initial production budget was $3 million for seven films. Films were to be B-films with an eye on quality but "meet the exhibitor's call for 'highly gimmicked and exploitable' product." In March 1957, AB-PT was talking with Republic and United Artists regarding distribution. The company's first film was Beginning of the End. With its first acquisition of The Unearthly in early May, AB-PT placed it into a double feature premiere with End released on June 19 at the B&K Roosevelt Theatre. On May 9, 1957, AB-PT Pictures executives met with the exhibition arm of the film industry where they announced their first slate of 7 films with announcement of a distributor in the next 10 days.

On June 6, 1957, AB-PT agreed to have Republic distribute their films. The company's first double bill films did well despite the films uneven quality. On September 24, 1957, AB-PT Pictures indicated that the company would move in the next year into A features with 5 of their 15 planned films to be of this type. For the A films, budgets would run from $.5 million to $1 million. However, AB-PT would only produce four films. AB-PT Pictures provided funding for The Bat (1959 film).

Levin along with Harry L. Mandell purchased AB-PT Pictures and AB-PT Distribution Corporation from AB-PT in May 1958. AB-PT Pictures was renamed Atlas Pictures Corporation.

FilmsBeginning of the End (June 19, 1957)The Unearthly (June 19, 1957)Eighteen and Anxious (February 1958)Girl in the Woods (February 1958)

Circle Seven Productions

Circle Seven Productions was the production company of ABC's owned-and-operated station in San Francisco, KGO-TV, in the 1950s and 1960s. The company produced shows for the network and for syndication. Shows produced included a Jack LaLanne fitness series and a Tennessee Ernie Ford daytime talk/variety series.

Keep Calm and Carry On Productions
Keep Calm and Carry On Productions, Inc. is an ABC subsidiary production company that produced Duets and The Glass House. Keep Calm was sued over The Glass House by CBS for using proprietary procedures from Big Brother via hired away staff.

Palomar Pictures International

Palomar Pictures International was a film production subsidiary of American Broadcasting Companies, Inc. It is not to be confused with another company with the name Palomar Pictures, founded in 1992 by Anne-Marie Mackay and Jonathon Ker and whose majority ownerhsip stake was sold to Sigurjon "Joni" Sighvattson, a founder of Propaganda Films, in 1999.

Palomar Pictures International was started by Edgar Scherick. In 1968, it started actively producing films for ABC.

In 1969, Palomar severed its ties with ABC and in 1970, Bristol-Myers's acquired a majority stake.

Selmur Productions

Selmur Productions, Inc. was formed in 1960 by Selig J. Seligman as a TV production arm of ABC-TV. Selmur Pictures, Inc., also headed by Seligman, was a film production company owned by American Broadcasting Companies, Inc. In 1968, Selmur Pictures, Inc. changed from being a supervising entity to an active film producer, while Selmur Productions was disbanded.

TV seriesCombatGarrison's GorillasGeneral HospitalShindigVictor Television Productions
Victor Television Productions was a boutique production company owned by ABC Entertainment.

On June 7, 1996, due to the merger with Disney, Capital Cities/ABC ended its ABC Productions division operations while keeping its boutique production companies: Victor Television Productions, ABC/Kane Productions, DIC Entertainment and Greengrass Productions.

Filmography
 Summertime Switch (October 8, 1994)
 Family Reunion: A Relative Nightmare (April 1, 1995) (co-production with Hickox-Bowman Productions Inc.)
 Spring Fling! (April 15, 1995) (co-production with Hickox-Bowman Productions Inc.)
 When The Vows Break (November 1, 1995)
 A Case For Life (February 18, 1996)
 The Stepford Husbands (May 14, 1996)
 The Siege at Ruby Ridge (May 19, 1996) (co-production with Edgar J. Scherick Associates and The Regan Company)
 Chasing The Dragon (June 19, 1996)
 For The Future: The Irvine Fertility Scandal (August 21, 1996)
 Devil's Food (September 2, 1996)
 Frank Herbert's Dune (December 3, 2000) (co-production with New Amsterdam Entertainment, Blixa Film Produktion and Hallmark Entertainment)
 Stephen King's Rose Red (January 27, 2002) (co-production with Greengrass Productions and Mark Carliner Productions)
 Frank Herbert's Children of Dune (mini-series; March 16–26, 2003)
 The Diary of Ellen Rimbauer'' (May 12, 2003)

See also
Animation studios owned by The Walt Disney Company
Movies produced by ABC
Other boutique theater film production companies
Time-Life Films
General Cinema
American Cinema
Filmways
Cinema Center Films

References

Michael McKenna. (August 22, 2013).  The ABC Movie of the Week: Big Movies for the Small Screen. Scarecrow Press. Accessed on December 31, 2013.

Cook, David A. (2000). Lost Illusions: American Cinema in the Shadow of Watergate and Vietnam, 1970–1979. University of California Press.

Television production companies of the United States
American Broadcasting Company